Ethiopia–Ireland relations are foreign relations between Ethiopia and Ireland. Both countries established diplomatic relations in 1994 , the same year Ireland opened an embassy in Addis Ababa. Ethiopia had an embassy in Dublin before its closure in 2021.

Both countries signed a Technical Agreement 21 February 1995. That same year the Minister of State at the Department of Foreign Affairs with responsibility for development cooperation, Joan Burton visited Ethiopia. The Minister of Foreign Affairs, Seyoum Mesfin visited Ireland, and in 2002 Prime Minister Meles Zenawi also paid Ireland a formal visit.

Foreign aid 
Ireland disbursed US$58.94 million to Ethiopia in 2007, making it sixth in bilateral donors. Irish foreign aid to Ethiopia includes grants towards focuses on Vulnerability, Health, Education, HIV and AIDS and Governance, either directly via Irish Aid, through NGOs, and missionary societies.  These grants amounted to € 32 million in 2007, and over €37 million in 2006. In January 2003, the Irish Minister of State at the Department of Foreign Affairs with responsibility for overseas aid, Tom Kitt, visited Ethiopia to see how his country could assist in famine relief. He planned to visit the Tigray Region, which was reported as being the most affected by famine at the time.

See also 
 Foreign relations of Ethiopia
 Foreign relations of the Republic of Ireland

References

External links 
  Ethiopian Ministry of Foreign Affairs about the relation with Ireland
  Ethiopian embassy in Dublin
  Irish embassy in Addis Ababa

 

 
Ireland
Bilateral relations of Ireland